Beta Ethniki 2002–03 complete season.

League table

Results

Promotion play-off

Ionikos retained their spot in 2003–04 Alpha Ethniki. Apollon Kalamarias placed on 2003–04 Beta Ethniki

Relegation play-off

Levadiakos were promoted to 2003–04 Beta Ethniki. Kavala were relegated to 2003–04 Gamma Ethniki.

Top scorers

References

External links 
RSSSF.org

Second level Greek football league seasons
Greece
2